Cedrobaena is an extinct genus of turtle which existed in the Tiffanian Cedar Point Quarry, Wyoming and in the latest Maastrichtian Hell Creek Formation, United States. It was first named by Tyler R. Lyson and Walter G. Joyce in 2009 and the type species is Cedrobaena putorius.

References

 * Cedrobaena at the Paleobiology Database

Baenidae
Prehistoric turtle genera
Late Cretaceous turtles of North America
Paleocene turtles
Cenozoic turtles of North America
Hell Creek fauna
Fossil taxa described in 2009